Joubert is a surname. It may also refer to:

 Joubert Engelbrecht (born 1989), South African rugby union player playing in Spain
 Joubert Horn (born 1988), South African former rugby union player
 Rue Joubert a street in the 9th arrondissement of Paris
 Joubert Rock, Graham Land, Antarctica
 Joubert, a lost manuscript, part of the Chronique romane, a chronicle of the French city of Montpellier

See also
 Joubert v Enslin, an important case in South African contract law
 Joubert's Pass, a mountain pass in the Eastern Cape province of South Africa
 Joubert syndrome, a genetic disorder